InstallAnywhere is a Java-based software tool for creating installers or software packages, for multiple platforms. It can also be used to create Virtual Appliances for Linux platforms using an existing installers or software packages. InstallAnywhere was originally made by Zero G Software until it was acquired by Macrovision in 2005, which later sold their software group, and InstallAnywhere became owned and supported by the spinoff Acresso Software, which in 2009 changed its name to Flexera Software. While previously there were 2 editions of InstallAnywhere, Professional and Premier, with additional Cloud and Virtualization add-on packs, as of the 2018 release, InstallAnywhere consolidated all features into 1 edition.

History
InstallAnywhere's main competitor was InstallShield MP (MultiPlatform). However, as Macrovision acquired both InstallShield and InstallAnywhere, it stopped the development of InstallShield MP and encouraged its users to migrate to InstallAnywhere 8. Similarly, there was an InstallAnywhere version that competed with InstallShield, called InstallAnywhere.NET (Windows only) based on a product acquisition from ActiveInstall. Again, Macrovision announced its EOL right after the Zero-G acquisition, and encouraged InstallAnywhere.NET users to migrate to InstallShield.

Release history
 Version 3.0.2 released beginning of 2000
 Version 3.5 released in September 2000
 Version 3.5.2 released between October 2000 and January 2001
 Version 3.5.3 released on 14 February 2001
 Version 4.0.1 released on 30 April 2001
 Version 4.5.3 released on 7 March 2002
 Version 5.0.7 released on 22 January 2003
 Version 5.5.3 released on 15 July 2003
 Version 6.0.0 released on 1 December 2003
 Version 6.1.0 released on 29 March 2004
 Version 7.0.0 released on 16 May 2005
 Version 7.1.0 released on 6 September 2005
 Version 7.1.3 released on 31 March 2006
 Version 8.0.0 released on 29 August 2006
 Version 8.0.1 released on 17 April 2007
 Version 2008 released on 18 October 2007
 Version 2008 Value Pack 1 released on 13 March 2008
 Version 2009 released on 3 November 2008
 Version 2009 Service Pack 1 released on 12 June 2009
 Version 2009 Service Pack 2 released on 10 November 2009
 Version 2010 released on 17 February 2010
 Version 2010 Hotfix released on 17 May 2010
 Version 2010 Service Pack 1 released on 13 August 2010
 Version 2010 Service Pack 1 Hotfix A released on 4 November 2010
 Version 2011 released on 17 May 2011
 Version 2011 SP1 released on 6 July 2011
 Version 2011 SP2 released on 23 September 2011
 Version 2011 SP3 released on 26 January 2011
 Version 2012 released on 10 October 2012
 Version 2012 SP1 released on 1 February 2013
 Version 2013 released on 17 October 2013
 Version 2014 released on 19 August 2014
 Version 2014 SP1 released on 2 December 2014
 Version 2015 released on 11 August 2015
 Version 2017 released on 2 November 2016
 Version 2017 SP1 released on 2 May 2017
 Version 2018 released on 3 March 2018
 Version 2018 SP1 released on 1 November 2018
 Version 2020 released on 4 October 2019
 Version 2020 SP1 released on 1 January 2020
 Version 2020 SP2 released on 30 June 2020
 Version 2021 released on 18 March 2021
 Version 2021 SP1 released on 21 July 2021
 Version 2021 SP2 released on 20 October 2021

Note: All versions up to version 2013 (including Service Packs) have completed their Standard Lifecycle.

See also
 
List of installation software

References 

Installation software